The 2007–08 Phoenix Coyotes season began on October 4, 2007. It was the franchise's 36th season, 29th in the National Hockey League (NHL) and 12th season as the Phoenix Coyotes.

Key dates prior to the start of the season:
 The 2007 NHL Entry Draft took place in Columbus, Ohio, on June 22–23.
 The free agency period began on July 1.

Regular season

Divisional standings

Conference standings

Schedule and results

October

Record: 4–6–0; Home: 1–5–0; Road: 3–1–0

November

Record: 7–6–0; Home: 3–2–0; Road: 4–4–0

December

Record: 7–6–1; Home: 2–3–1; Road: 5–3–0

January

Record: 9–4–1; Home: 5–1–1; Road: 4–3–0

February

Record: 6–5–3; Home: 3–3–1; Road: 3–2–2

March

Record: 4–9–1; Home: 3–5–1; Road: 1–4–0

April

Record: 1–1–1; Home: 0–1–0; Road: 1–0–1

Playoffs
The Coyotes failed to qualify for the playoffs for the fifth consecutive season.

Player statistics

Skaters
Note: GP = Games played; G = Goals; A = Assists; Pts = Points; PIM = Penalty minutes

Goaltenders
Note: GP = Games played; TOI = Time on ice (minutes); W = Wins; L = Losses; OT = Overtime/shootout losses; GA = Goals against; SO = Shutouts; Sv% = Save percentage; GAA = Goals against average

Awards and records

Records

Milestones
For the second straight season, the Phoenix Coyotes are last in revenue in the NHL, losing $300,000 a game, or $30 million this season. Phoenix has never had a money-making season since the franchise left the city of Winnipeg in the 1996–97 season.

Transactions
The Coyotes have been involved in the following transactions during the 2007–08 season.

Trades

Free Agents

Waivers

Draft picks
Phoenix' picks at the 2007 NHL Entry Draft in Columbus, Ohio.

Farm teams
San Antonio Rampage
The San Antonio Rampage are the Coyotes American Hockey League affiliate in 2007–08.

Arizona Sundogs
The Arizona Sundogs are the Coyotes affiliate in the CHL.

See also
 2007–08 NHL season

References

 Player stats: Phoenix Coyotes player stats on espn.com
 Game log: Phoenix Coyotes game log on espn.com
 Team standings: NHL standings on espn.com

Pho
Pho
Arizona Coyotes seasons